Reinhard Roder (born 6 July 1941 in Clausthal-Zellerfeld) is a German former football player and manager.

Roder made a total of 11 appearances in the Bundesliga for 1. FC Köln during his playing career and later managed 1. SC Göttingen 05, VfL Osnabrück and Tennis Borussia Berlin in the 2. Bundesliga Nord.

References

External links
 

1941 births
Living people
People from Goslar (district)
Footballers from Lower Saxony
German footballers
Association football defenders
Bundesliga players
1. FC Köln players
Bayer 04 Leverkusen players
German football managers
Tennis Borussia Berlin managers
2. Bundesliga managers
VfL Osnabrück managers